Night at the Crossroads is a 1932 French film by Jean Renoir, based on the novel of the same title (known in English as Maigret at the Crossroads) by Georges Simenon and starring Renoir's brother Pierre Renoir as Simenon's popular detective, Inspector Maigret.

The French director Jacques Becker, then apprentice to Renoir, worked as assistant director and production manager on the film.

Reputation and influence 
Often cited as being Jean Renoir's least well-known sound film, Night at the Crossroads has nonetheless maintained a very strong critical reputation. In an article republished as part of André Bazin's book on Renoir, the French New Wave critic and filmmaker Jean-Luc Godard described it as being "Renoir's most mysterious film" and "the only great French detective movie--in fact, the greatest of all adventure movies."

At a symposium on the Hungarian filmmaker Béla Tarr held at Facets Multimedia on 16 September 2007, American film critic Jonathan Rosenbaum mentioned that Tarr's then-new feature, The Man from London (also based on a novel by Georges Simenon), was influenced by Night at the Crossroads.

References

External links 
 
 

1932 films
1932 crime drama films
French crime drama films
Police detective films
Maigret films
Films directed by Jean Renoir
French black-and-white films
1930s French-language films
1930s police procedural films
1930s Dutch-language films
1932 multilingual films
French multilingual films
1930s French films